Hedevig may refer to:

 Hedevig Johanne Bagger (1740-1822), Danish inn-keeper and postmaster
 Hedevig Lund (1824–1888), Norwegian painter
 Ida Hedevig Moltke (1744–1816), Danish countess and letter writer
 Hedevig Rasmussen (1902–1985), Danish freestyle swimmer who competed in the 1924 Summer Olympics
 Hedevig Rosing (1827–1913), author, educator, school founder; first woman to teach in Copenhagen's public schools
 Hedevig Ulfeldt, (1626–1678), daughter of king Christian IV of Denmark and Kirsten Munk